Kanstantsin Kazakow (born 14 June 1999) is a Belarusian professional footballer who plays for Partizan Soligorsk.

References

External links 
 
 

1999 births
Living people
Belarusian footballers
Association football forwards
FC Minsk players
FC Torpedo Minsk players
FC Krumkachy Minsk players